Neoscaptia torquata is a moth of the subfamily Arctiinae. It was described by Rudolf van Eecke in 1929. It is found on Buru in Indonesia.

References

Moths described in 1929
Lithosiini